Pākehā settlers were European emigrants who journeyed to New Zealand, and especially to the Auckland, Wellington, Hawkes Bay, Canterbury and Otago regions during the 19th century. The ethnic and occupational social composition of these New Zealand Europeans or Pākehā varied from settlement to settlement.

Early settlements

There was minimal immigration to New Zealand directly after 1769 when Captain James Cook first visited the islands. Between 1805 and 1835 the European population grew very slowly. Most Europeans were itinerant sailors. The Bay of Islands and the Hokianga in Northland had the most Europeans with about 200 in the 1830s. Because there were almost no European women, European men lived with Māori women and the population of part European ancestry grew faster than the purely European population. Before 1835, most migrants were runaway sailors, escaped convicts, sealers, whalers and missionaries with their families. Initially most part European children grew up mainly as Māori, but able to speak fluent English. Some of these children were sent to Australia by their fathers to receive a formal education.

An early custom of Pākehā settlers was to use the native poroporo berry to make jam. As more settlers arrived, feral pigs released during the earliest visits to the islands, which became known as Captain Cooker types, became scarcer as they were over-hunted. Despite often being poor and burdened with debt, Pākehā settlers working and farming new land benefited from the infrastructure of the British Empire, with secure titles, Crown-granted lands and protection by Land Transfer Acts.

The New Zealand Company

Edward Gibbon Wakefield established the New Zealand Company in 1839. This company was established to attract settlers from England to set up homes and farms in New Zealand. The objective of the company was to bring over a ‘slice of England'. The company wanted a range of people from working class to upper class to establish a similar class system in New Zealand as was in England. Settlers were offered paid passage and the possibility of eventually buying land at a price low enough to attract them, but high enough to make them work manually for a few years to earn it. This principle was applied in many areas throughout New Zealand. Generally, it worked and settlers began to arrive in droves. This continued into the 1850s, with unprecedented masses of Pākehā settlers arriving from Britain and Europe, most of which understood little of local Māori culture and customs.

Wellington
Wellington was the first official settlement set up by the New Zealand Company for recently arrived immigrants. The first settlers arrived at Petone from England in 1840. At this point the majority of immigrants sailed from England, particularly London, but may have originated elsewhere in the UK. Most of those who arrived were timber workers, bullock drivers, shopkeepers, rope makers and artisans. This posed a problem as Wellington was an agricultural settlement but there were few people with the skills to farm the land. It was clear that neither the occupational or social composition of this early settlement was varied and as a result this assisted in giving Wellington a shaky beginning as a developing settlement.

Whanganui
Wanganui was the second Wakefield settlement to be established although it was set up with some reluctance. Late 1840 Wellington settlers found that there was insufficient land available in their original settlement to satisfy their land claims and Colonel Wakefield was forced to offer them the option of land in the Wanganui settlement. Bringing with them England's Victorian era cultural practices, their settlement resulted in the social and occupational composition of Wanganui being much the same as Wellington. There was already a Māori population in Wanganui and they disputed the questionable land purchase by the New Zealand Company. There was unrest between the Māori and Pākehā until 1848, when Donald Maclean, an assistant to the Native Protector, sorted out boundaries and land title by purchasing the area officially.

New Plymouth

New Plymouth was the following settlement to be established. Originally the development of the settlement was organised by The Plymouth Company but they merged with the New Zealand Company in 1840, resulting in New Plymouth becoming the next Wakefield settlement. Workers were attracted from England by being offered jobs working on establishing roads in the New Plymouth area. This originally brought a large number of settlers to the region but in 1843 it was no longer financially viable for the English company in charge of this arrangement to offer this opportunity. The company in England to reduce spending gave the local agent and as a result they ended the offer of employment provided by the company. Because of the lack of employment opportunities that this resulted in many settlers left new Plymouth choosing to move to Auckland or even Adelaide. This did leave more job opportunities for the remaining settlers and by the mid-1850s New Plymouth began to prosper; by that time it had a population of 2000. It had the resources to export wheat, barley and oats to other settlements and the land was extremely cultivatable.

Otago

In 1842 The New Zealand Company decided that they would establish a settlement for Scottish Presbyterian immigrants. Fred Tuckett was employed to find the settlement and do the surveying. He settled on Otago in the South Island. Because of the isolation in Otago and the lack of previous development in the area, it was difficult to attract prospective farm owners. However the resident agent for The New Zealand Company who lived in the area was determined to get the scheme underway. A promotional campaign started up in Scotland and a public meeting in the Glasgow Trades Hall inspired people enough to warrant the use of two ships to transport the new settlers to New Zealand. It did take time to establish the settlement in Otago mainly because the majority of the Scottish settlers were only working class and relatively poor. This meant that occupation wise they did everything for themselves, unable to afford to employ labour. Once the settlement had got under way most settlers had succeeded in establishing themselves on farms and were making money from agricultural work.

The Canterbury Association

In 1848 The Canterbury Association was formed after a meeting between Edward Gibbon Wakefield and businessman John Robert Godley. The Canterbury Association had clear and simple plans. A block of one million acres (4,000 km²) was to be acquired from the New Zealand Company and sold to intending immigrants at £3 per acre.’ (Century of Change). The Canterbury Association did not want to have the same problems that The New Zealand Company had with absentee ownership in their settlements. To combat this, the Association required land purchasers or their representatives to be present in the colony before they could buy land. Unfortunately land sales were disappointing and even after a campaign promoting the Canterbury settlement the first batch of settlers included 545 with assisted passages and only 40 paying the full price. Because there were so few people there was not a varied range of labourers available, the majority of settlers were farmers and as a result it took longer to get the settlement underway.

Auckland

Auckland was initially an unplanned settlement, established solely by settlers themselves through migration and immigration to the area. Land was easy to purchase from Māori as the isthmus had been fought over by many hapu for several generations during the musket wars and the native population had either been killed and eaten as at Panmure or fled or welcomed the protection afforded by large numbers of Europeans and their technology. The whole of Eastern Auckland was bought by William Fairburn after local Māori pleaded with him to buy the land to protect them from the feared Ngapuhi invaders. After 1847 large numbers (over 2,500) of retired British soldiers called fencibles and their families came to Auckland and established new outlying settlements at Panmure, Howick, Otahuhu and Onehunga. They were organized by Governor Grey and the force was called Royal New Zealand Fencible Corps. These formed a defensive ring against any possible Māori attack from the south. By 1853 there were approximately 8000 people living in the Auckland area with a wide range of skills among them and with about 17000 acres (69 km²) in crops. Auckland was the closest in New Zealand to an agricultural settlement.

20th century
Pākehā settlers were still arriving well into the 20th century, with Department of Health statistics showing that post-1900, tuberculosis was still the main cause of unnatural death among them. The 1906-1908 Native Land Commission, headed by Robert Stout and Āpirana Ngata, encouraged the sale of unoccupied or seemingly underdeveloped Māori lands to Pākehā settlers. Historian David Vernon Williams suggests, by the early 20th century, "colonial state power had overwhelmed tribal rangatiratanga in an insistent and persistent exercise of forceful measures to individualise land holdings and to promote colonisation by Pākehā settlers".

Reasons for settlement
The voyage from England to New Zealand was long and arduous and often took over three months so settlers choosing to move to New Zealand had to have good incentives. One factor that attracted people to New Zealand was the fact that it was such a young country. It was not highly political like England, did not have a rigid class structure and, in their opinion, New Zealand provided equal opportunities for all new immigrants. This newness gave settlers a chance to start from scratch at the same level everybody else was starting and to many people who may have struggled financially in England, this was very attractive.

Environment
Campaign posters advertising New Zealand in England did give many settlers false hopes, manipulating their reasons. These posters often described New Zealand as an island paradise, complete with white sandy beaches and coconut trees. This heavenly image also did a lot to attract settlers to New Zealand, as it was such a welcome contrast to the rain and cold weather in England. Many settlers also believed that the paradise New Zealand was presented as would be good for their families' health as the warm weather as well as the small population in New Zealand could keep dangerous diseases that were arising in England to a minimum in New Zealand.

Another factor in attracting people to New Zealand was families who had already settled writing to their relatives back in Great Britain telling them what a wonderful place New Zealand was. Sometimes these letters were sincere and people truly had discovered a much better life in New Zealand and wanted their relatives to share in the spoils, but sometimes there were other motives. Pure loneliness and isolation could encourage people to write exaggerated letters to their relatives in the hope of luring their extended families to join them thus providing them with some comfort. There were also settlers who were afraid to admit to their families back home that they had made a mistake in coming to New Zealand and so, to save face they chose to exaggerate the positive sides of living in New Zealand and keep quiet about the negative factors. This writing of letters by settlers back to their families in the United Kingdom resulted in a chain reaction as more and more people were encouraged to come out and join their families.

Land
Another factor in attracting people to New Zealand was undoubtedly the prospect of owning land. The New Zealand Company had purchased large amounts of land from local Māori, which they were willing to sell to settlers at a low price as a way of attracting them to New Zealand. At this time Europeans were seen by Māori as a tuku or gift as they brought with them new skills and technology. The scheme worked, thousands of people who would have had no hope of owning land in the United Kingdom were given the opportunity to do so in New Zealand. Settlers found this attractive because they could farm it and make money from it as well as being able to keep it in the family for future generations. Few of the new settlers understood Māori or the recent history of wholesale tribal upheaval, nor the Māori tradition of associating mana or power with the conquering of land.

Legacy

Trade and developed economy
The settlements of Wellington, Wanganui, Nelson, New Plymouth, Otago, Canterbury and Auckland were vital in allowing New Zealand to prosper. Although their development did not always go according to plan, they provided New Zealand with a good foundation of settlements in which farming and industry could be established so that eventually New Zealand could become a viable country for trade. Although there was not originally a large range of occupations and races in the society, the establishment of large towns did provide opportunity for the occupational and social composition to become more diverse as more settlers arrived. New Zealand did have many problems as a developing country but often the life it offered prospective settlers was better than anything they could have hoped for in Great Britain. The chance of jobs, land ownership and a healthier environment for children to grow up in was often worth the long voyage and hard work which were necessities for new immigrants.

European customs
Early Pākehā settlers brought a range of European customs with them to what would become New Zealand. According to Christchurch newspaper The Press, European emigrants to Aotearoa transported over many of their cultural and political norms; "Pākehā settlers brought with them a profound belief in self-reliance, property rights, and the autonomy of local communities". Property rights came with a new and foreign understanding, alien to the native customs; both an ideological and distinctively European concept.

Pākehā guilt

In the 2004 essay "Cultural vandalism" and Pākehā politics of guilt and responsibility, the concept of white guilt, or Pākehā guilt, is explored as a legacy of colonial settlement. In 2002, then in opposition, future Prime Minister Bill English, was said to reject the "cringing guilt" from the legacy of Pākehā settlers, after the government Race Relations Commissioner compared the cultural impact of European settlement in the islands, with the Taliban destruction of the Buddhas of Bamyan.

Elizabeth Rata has argued that while the Waitangi Tribunal had served as a chance to acknowledge wrongs and resolve Pākehā guilt, the opportunity was missed; "Without the mirror image of unexpiated guilt, a necessary process in the recognition and validation of a shared reality, Pākehā guilt moved, not onto the next stage of externalised shame, but into an internal and enclosed narcissism". In 2007, anthropologist Michael Jackson wrote that the Museum of New Zealand Te Papa Tongarewa was an expression of residual "liberal Pākehā guilt" in its "extolling Māori spiritual superiority and pandering to the stereoptype of crass Western materialism, Pākehā seek to compensate Māori for their political powerlessness without actually changing the status quo".

References 

Immigration to New Zealand
19th century in New Zealand
European New Zealander